Prince Valiant is a 1954 American adventure film directed by Henry Hathaway and produced by Robert L. Jacks, in Technicolor and Cinemascope from 20th Century Fox. Based on the King Features syndicated newspaper comic strip of the same name by Hal Foster, the film stars James Mason, Janet Leigh, Robert Wagner, Debra Paget and Sterling Hayden.

Plot
Usurper Sligon, a worshipper of the old Norse god pantheon, and other rebel Vikings have forced into exile the Christian royal family of the Viking kingdom of Scandia: King Aguar, his wife, and their son Prince Valiant. Aguar and his family come under the protection of King Arthur. When Valiant has grown to a man, he is sent to Camelot to undergo training as a knight under the tutelage of Aguar's family friend, the noble knight of the Round Table, Sir Gawain.

During his wanderings, Valiant witnesses a clandestine meeting between a group of Sligon's Vikings and a black-clad knight. Valiant is discovered by the Vikings, but with slyness and improvisation he manages to elude his pursuers. During his flight, Valiant runs into Gawain. After Valiant convinces Gawain that he is indeed the son of Aguar, Gawain listens to the prince's story of the mysterious Black Knight, a knight known only in rumor in Camelot, and takes Valiant to King Arthur. Arthur decrees that Valiant be trained as a prospective knight by undergoing the rigors of squirehood. One of Arthur's knights, Sir Brack, offers to train him, but Valiant is instead assigned to Gawain.

Brack offers to take Valiant to the place where the young prince has seen the Black Knight in order to backtrack the mysterious figure. Once there, they separate, but shortly afterwards Valiant is ambushed by a group of bowmen and escapes with an arrow in his back. He stumbles into the territory of King Luke and is taken in by his daughters, Aleta and Ilene. Aleta and Valiant fall in love, but Luke disapproves of Valiant's Viking origin and so their relationship must remain a secret for the time being. From Aleta, Valiant also learns that Ilene is secretly attracted to Gawain.

Valiant returns to Camelot and discovers to his shock that Gawain tried to find him, also ran into an ambush by the Black Knight, and escaped within an inch of his life. Noting that Brack had temporarily disappeared around the same time, Valiant becomes suspicious, but on the advice of Gawain he suppresses his suspicion.

Some time later, Aleta and Ilene attend a tournament held in Camelot in their honor; as an added prize, the winner of this joust will win Aleta's hand. Valiant dons the armor of Gawain, who is too seriously wounded to participate, in order to win Aleta, but he fails and is unmasked. But then another contender appears and wins the bout before falling off his horse; this knight turns out to be Gawain. Awakening on his sickbed, Gawain beholds Aleta and falls head over heels in love with her, and out of respect for his patron Valiant does not dare tell him the truth.

For his act of presumption, Valiant is confined to his quarters and forced to attend to his master. A mysterious messenger comes to the castle to see Brack, and the same night, Aguar's seal is thrown through the window of Gawain's chambers. Realizing that his parents are in trouble, Valiant immediately leaves Camelot, leaving a bewildered Aleta behind. But as he prepares to return to his home, he is ambushed and captured by Sligon's Vikings and the Black Knight, who reveals himself as Brack. Brack has made a pact with Sligon: For delivering Aguar's family, Sligon will assist Brack in conquering Camelot and thus becoming the King over Britain.

Shortly, Aleta, unwilling to let Valiant run off, arrives and is subsequently captured, and the two are brought to Scandia, where Sligon prepares to execute them and Valiant's captured parents. However, a group of Christian Vikings, led by Aguar and Valiant's old friend Boltar, stage a revolution, and Boltar infiltrates the castle. Valiant escapes his cell and teams up with Boltar, who intends to assassinate Sligon and have Valiant give the attack signal to their cohorts once Sligon has fallen. But Valiant is discovered before Boltar manages to kill Sligon, and during his struggle with a guard, a false signal is given, signaling the Christian Vikings to attack too early. Just as things seem bleak, Valiant sets several parts of the castle ablaze, throwing the defenders into confusion, and slays Sligon in single combat.

Some time later, Valiant returns to Camelot with Aleta and accuses Brack of treachery before the king and the assembled Round Table. Brack calls for a trial by combat, and despite Gawain's protests and his offer to fight in Valiant's stead, the young prince accepts. After a long fight, Valiant succeeds in killing the traitor. He offers Aleta back to his master, but during the long period of worry, Gawain has finally come to learn the truth, and he and Ilene have fallen in love. In the end, having redeemed his honor by exposing the traitor, Valiant is made a fully privileged Knight of the Round Table.

Cast
 Robert Wagner as Prince Valiant
 James Mason as Sir Brack
 Janet Leigh as Princess Aleta of Ord
 Debra Paget as Princess Ilene of Ord
 Sterling Hayden as Sir Gawain
 Victor McLaglen as Boltar
 Donald Crisp as Aguar, exiled King of Scandia
 Brian Aherne as King Arthur
 Barry Jones as King Luke of Ord
 Mary Philips as Queen of Scandia
 Howard Wendell as Morgan Todd
 Tom Conway as Sir Kay
 Primo Carnera as Sligon, usurping King of Scandia
 Don Megowan as Sir Lancelot
 Richard Webb as Sir Galahad
 Jarma Lewis as Queen Guinevere
 Neville Brand as Viking Warrior Chief
 John Davidson as Patriarch
 John Dierkes as Sir Tristram
 Otto Waldis as Patch-Eye
 Percival Vivian as Royal Physician
 Robert Adler as Brack's Man-at-Arms
 James Dime

Production
20th Century Fox obtained the rights to the comic strip after MGM allowed their option to lapse. The film was the idea of producer Robert Jacks, the son-in-law of Fox head Darryl F. Zanuck. Fox bought the rights to eight years of published comic strip stories, but adapted only a 1937 storyline.

In December 1952 Henry Hathaway was assigned as director. Medieval swashbucklers had been an experiencing a recent surge of popularity since the success of MGM's Ivanhoe (1952).

In March 1953 Robert Wagner was cast to star in the title role. He had his hair cut to match that in the comic strip. The actor later joked "Dean Martin passed me on the lot and thought I was Jane Wyman".

Shot in CinemaScope, the film - along with The Robe - would be the studio's biggest production of the year, with a budget of $3 million. Michael Rennie was going to play King Arthur and Robert Newton Bolthar. Hathaway and producer Robert Jacks left for England in April to scout locations. Eventually, neither Rennie or Newton would appear in the final film.

The castle was constructed at a cost of $83,000. The castle battle sequence cost $250,000. Filming started July 7, 1953 on the Fox backlot although Hathaway shot background footage in Scotland from April through to June. The shoot took until November 1953.

A sequel, Valiant and Aleta dealing with Valiant's married life with Aleta, was planned but never produced.

Reception

Box Office
According to contemporary reports the film made $2.6 million in North America, which did not recoup its reported cost of $2.9 million.

Critical
Bosley Crowther of The New York Times wrote that the film was a faithful adaptation of the comic strip, and that the best part were the epic action scenes. He observed that the film would satisfy younger viewers. Variety wrote: "Although the picture comes in a bit overlength at 100 minutes, the direction and Dudley Nichols' scripting combine to bring it off acceptably against some rather dazzling settings, including authentic castles actually lensed in England". A rave review in Harrison's Reports called it "one of the most exciting and thrilling action-filled romantic adventure melodramas ever brought to the screen", and called Wagner "a human dynamo" in the title role. John McCarten of The New Yorker wrote in a negative review of the film that "as it flounders about, it cuts some unintentionally comic capers that might amuse you if you are feeling amiable ... Prince Valiant is played by Robert Wagner, who reads his lines in a vacant monotone and wears a long Dutch bob and a jerkin with the skittish air of a man trying to be funny in a lady's hat". The Monthly Film Bulletin declared, "Judged as an articulated comic strip, the film is intermittently amusing; by any other standards, it is merely a tasteless costume-piece".

References

External links 
 
 
 

1954 films
1954 adventure films
20th Century Fox films
American adventure films
Arthurian films
Films scored by Franz Waxman
Films based on American comics
Films directed by Henry Hathaway
Films set in castles
Films shot in England
Live-action films based on comics
Films with screenplays by Dudley Nichols
Prince Valiant
CinemaScope films
1950s English-language films
1950s American films